There are thousands of rodeos held worldwide each year. Here are a few you might like, such as the Carbondale Wild West Rodeo, in Carbondale, Colorado.

Australia

New South Wales
 Sydney Royal Easter Show holds rodeo events during the show.
 Coonamble campdraft and rodeo
 Walcha campdraft and rodeo held each January in Walcha

Queensland
 Augathella Diggers Rodeo held in Augathella since 1933, on Easter Saturday.
 Curry Merry Muster held in Cloncurry since 1954, on the first weekend in August.
 Mareeba Rodeo held in Mareeba since 1949, on the second weekend in July.
 Mount Isa Rotary Rodeo held in Mount Isa since 1959, on the second weekend in August.
 Warwick Rodeo held in Warwick since 1906, on the last weekend in October.

Victoria
 Great Western Rodeo in Great Western

Brazil

Goiás
 Rodeio de Aparecida de Goiânia in Aparecida de Goiânia, Goiás
 Caldas Country Show in Caldas Novas, Goiás
 Rodeio de Goiânia in Goiânia, Goiás
 Expo Rio Verde in Rio Verde, Goiás
 Rodeio de Quirinópolis in Quirinópolis, Goiás

Mato Grosso
 ExpoAgro in Cuiabá, Mato Grosso
 ExpoSul in Rondonópolis, Mato Grosso
 Rodeio de Juína in Juína, Mato Grosso
 Rodeio de Nova Mutum in Nova Mutum, Mato Grosso
 Rodeio de Sinop in Sinop, Mato Grosso

Mato Grosso do Sul
 8 Segundos Rodeio Show in Campo Grande, Mato Grosso do Sul
 ExpoAgro Dourados in Dourados, Mato Grosso do Sul
 ExpoGrande in Campo Grande, Mato Grosso do Sul
 Rodeio de Maracaju in Maracaju, Mato Grosso do Sul
 Rodeio Naviraí in Naviraí, Mato Grosso do Sul
 ExpoPar - Paranaíba in Paranaíba, Mato Grosso do Sul
 Rodeio Taboadão in Aparecida do Taboado, Mato Grosso do Sul
 Rodeio de Sonora in Sonora, Mato Grosso do Sul

Paraná
 Festa do Peão de Boiadeiro de Colorado in Colorado, Paraná
 Rodeio de Douradina(Fepeina) in Douradina, Paraná
 Rodeio de Maringá (Expoingá) in Maringá, Paraná
 Expo-Perola in Perola, Paraná

São Paulo

 Festa do Peão de Americana in Americana, São Paulo
 Festa do Peão de Boiadeiro in Barretos, São Paulo
 Festa do Peão de Cajamar in Cajamar, São Paulo
 Expo Fernandópolis in Fernandópolis, São Paulo
 Festa do Peão de Paulo de Faria in Paulo de Faria, São Paulo
 Festa do Peão de Novo Horizonte in Novo Horizonte, São Paulo
 Jaguariúna Rodeo Festival in Jaguariúna, São Paulo

Canada

Alberta

 Bruce Stampede in Bruce
 Calgary Stampede and Exhibition in Calgary
 Canadian Finals Rodeo in Red Deer
 Grande Prairie Stompede in Grande Prairie
 Hand Hills Lake Stampede in Hand Hills Lake, Alberta Alberta's longest continually run rodeo, started in 1917.
 Ponoka Stampede in Ponoka being Canada's largest 7-day Pro Rodeo.
 Raymond Stampede in Raymond being Canada's first and oldest rodeo, started in 1902.
 Strathmore Stampede in Strathmore Canada's 3rd largest rodeo.
 Wildrose Rodeo Finals in Barrhead
 Stavely Pro Rodeo in Stavely, Alberta being the world's first indoor rodeo.
 Medicine Hat Exhibition and Stampede in Medicine Hat, Alberta 
 Spring Indoor Rodeo in Medicine Hat, Alberta
 Rainmaker Rodeo in St. Albert, Alberta
 Kikino Rodeo Days in Kikino, Alberta
 Rockyford Rodeo in Rockyford, Alberta

British Columbia
 Cloverdale Rodeo and Country Fair in the town centre of Cloverdale, in Surrey
 Williams Lake Stampede held in Williams Lake, British Columbia around the 1 July long weekend each year.

Manitoba
The Manitoba Stampede and Exhibition is the largest professional rodeo east of Calgary, Alberta. It held in the town of Morris, Manitoba during the month of July. Started in 1963. [www.manitobastampede.ca/schedule.php]

Ontario
 North American Professional Cowboys Extreme Tour Finals: over 30 Events throughout the season lead into the Extreme Tour Finals on New Year's Eve in London, Ontario

Saskatchewan
 Wood Mountain Stampede in Wood Mountain Regional Park, Saskatchewan, the Oldest Continuous Rodeo in Canada. Held during the month of July. Started in 1890.

Quebec
 Festival Western de Saint-Tite in Saint-Tite, the 2nd Largest Rodeo in Canada

Guyana

Upper Takutu-Upper Essequibo
 Rupununi Rodeo, Held every Easter weekend in Lethem.

Mexico

Nuevo León
 El Corral Rodeo in Monterrey, Nuevo León
 Far West Rodeo in Monterrey, Nuevo León
 Arena Rodeo Pesquería in Pesquería, Nuevo León

Philippines
 Rodeo Masbateño in Masbate City, Masbate

United States

Arizona
 Fiesta de los Vaqueros, a week-long event in Tucson
 World's Oldest Rodeo in Prescott, White Mountain Apache Tribe Fair and Rodeo starts on a Wednesday night with the Thunder on the Mountain Bullbash ending with the finals on Monday
 World's Oldest Continuous Rodeo in Payson, started in 1884. Third weekend of August.
 Taylor's Annual 4 July Night Rodeo. Saturday before or after the 4th.

Arkansas
Arkansas State Fair Rodeo, at the Arkansas State Fair in Little Rock.
Old Fort Days Rodeo, traditionally beginning on Memorial Day weekend in Fort Smith.
Rodeo of the Ozarks in Springdale.

California
California Rodeo Salinas in Salinas
Clovis Rodeo in Clovis, California
Grand National Rodeo at the Cow Palace in San Francisco, See also Miss Grand National.
Red Bluff Round-Up at the Tehama District Fairgrounds in Red Bluff.
Redding Rodeo
Santa Maria Elks Rodeo & Parade

Colorado
Pikes Peak or Bust Rodeo in Colorado Springs
National Western Stock Show in Denver
Greeley Stampede in Greeley
Colorado State Fair home of the PBR in Pueblo
Elizabeth Stampede Rodeo, first full week-end in June, Elizabeth
Carbondale Wild West Rodeo, June 3-August 19, every Thursday night, 7:30-9:00 pm

Connecticut
 Goshen Stampede in Goshen

Florida
 Silver Spurs Rodeo in Kissimmee
 Citrus stampede rodeo in Inverness
 Okeechobee rodeo
 Dade city rodeo
 Homestead rodeo
 Ocala rodeo

Idaho
War Bonnet Roundup in Idaho Falls, Idaho Idaho's Oldest Rodeo
 Snake River Stampede Rodeo in Nampa, Idaho
 Lewiston Round-Up in Lewiston, Idaho
Caldwell Night Rodeo in Caldwell, Idaho
That Famous Preston Night Rodeo in Preston, Idaho

Iowa
Tri State Rodeo in Fort Madison Iowa

Kansas
 Beef Empire Days Rodeo in Garden City, Kansas 
 Dodge City Roundup Rodeo in Dodge City, Kansas 
Flint Hills Rodeo in Strong City, Kansas 
Seward County PRCA Rodeo in Liberal, Kansas 
Wild Bill Hickok Rodeo in Abilene, Kansas http://www.wildbillhickokrodeo.com/

Louisiana
 Angola Prison Rodeo at the Louisiana State Penitentiary

Maryland
IBR (International Bull Rider's) - multiple rodeos are held throughout the northeast US by this organization, but most are in Maryland.

Minnesota
 Minnesota Rodeo Association
 North Star Gay Rodeo

Mississippi
 Columbia Stampede Rodeo, Columbia, Mississippi, rodeo's first night rodeo held outdoors under electric lights in 1935
 Dixie National Rodeo and Livestock Show, Jackson, Mississippi

Missouri
 American Royal in Kansas City, Missouri
 Sikeston Jaycee Bootheel Rodeo in Sikeston, Missouri

Montana
NILE Rodeo in Billings
Last Chance Stampede, Helena
Livingston Roundup. Livingston
Chase Hawks Memorial Rough Stock Rodeo in Billings

Nebraska
River City Rodeo & Stock Show in Omaha, Nebraska

New Jersey
Cowtown Rodeo in Woodstown, New Jersey

New Mexico
Rodeo de Santa Fe in Santa Fe The Annual "RODEO! de Santa Fe" is set for last week of June. Today, one of the top 100 rodeos in the nation.

Nevada
 National Finals Rodeo in Las Vegas
 Reno Rodeo in Reno, Nevada

Oklahoma
 International Finals Youth Rodeo in Shawnee
 Oklahoma Outlaw Prison Rodeo the largest "Behind The Walls" rodeo in the world and only PRCA-sanctioned prison rodeo in McAlester
 "Ride for the Brand" Ranch Rodeo fundraiser ranch rodeo for Oklahoma State University Rodeo team, one of the oldest NIRA sanctioned rodeo clubs in Oklahoma, held in Stillwater the first Saturday every October.
 Woodward Elks Rodeo in Woodward, Oklahoma

“Guymon Pioneer Day” Guymon, Oklahoma. PRCA hall of fame rodeo and richest rodeo in Oklahoma

Oregon
 Chief Joseph Days Rodeo in Joseph, Oregon
 Eastern Oregon Livestock Show & Rodeo in Union, Oregon
 Farm City Pro Rodeo in Hermiston, Oregon
 Molalla Buckeroo in Molalla, Oregon
 Pendleton Round-Up in Pendleton, Oregon
 Eugene Pro Rodeo in Eugene, Oregon
 Clackamas County Fair and Rodeo in Canby, Oregon
 St Paul Rodeo in St. Paul, Oregon/

Texas
 Angelina Benefit Rodeo in Lufkin, Texas
 West Texas Fair and Rodeo in Abilene, Texas
 Rodeo Austin in Austin, Texas
 Southwestern Exposition and Livestock Show in Fort Worth
 Women's Finals Rodeo in Fort Worth
 Houston Livestock Show and Rodeo in Houston
 Mesquite Championship Rodeo in Mesquite
 SandHills Stock Show and Rodeo in Odessa
 San Antonio Stock Show & Rodeo in San Antonio
 San Angelo Stock Show & Rodeo in San Angelo
 Texas Cowboy Reunion in Stamford
 Southwestern International PRCA Rodeo in El Paso, Texas
 XIT Ranch Rodeo and Reunion in Dalhart, Texas

Utah
Days of '47 Rodeo in Salt Lake City
 Ogden Pioneer Day Rodeo in Ogden (weeklong rodeo)

Washington
Ellensburg Rodeo in Ellensburg
Omak Stampede in Omak
Puyallup Rodeo, held during the Puyallup Fair in Puyallup, Washington
Roy Pioneer Rodeo, in Roy, Washington
Thunder Mountain Rodeo in Kelso - Longview
Vancouver Rodeo in Vancouver - Vancouver
Kitsap Fair and Stampede in Bremerton

Wisconsin
Heart of the North Rodeo in Spooner

Wyoming
Cheyenne Frontier Days in Cheyenne
Cody Nite Rodeo in Cody
Cody Stampede Rodeo in Cody
College National Finals Rodeo in Casper
National High School Finals Rodeo in Rock Springs
Pine Bluffs Summer Rodeo in Pine Bluffs
Sheridan WYO Rodeo in Sheridan

See also 
Frontier Days
List of corrals

References 

 
Rodeo